Ethemon brevicorne is a species of beetle in the family Cerambycidae. It was described by Napp and Reynaud in 1998.

References

Unxiini
Beetles described in 1998